The 2010 Tajik Football Super Cup was the 1st Tajik Supercup match, a football match which was contested between the 2009 Tajik League champions, Vakhsh Qurghonteppa, and the Tajik Cup champions, Istiklol.

Match details

See also
2009 Tajik League
2009 Tajik Cup

References

Super Cup
Tajik Supercup